Stoewer 10 PS was convertible car manufactured in Stettin, Germany (now Szczecin, Poland) by Stoewer automotive company between 1901 and 1902. It is the first car created by the company. It had a four-wheel drive and 1.5-litre internal combustion engine.

Specifications 
The car was a 2-door convertible with a 1.5-litre straight-2-cylinder internal combustion engine with the power of 18 horsepower (13 kW) and 17 brake horsepower. It had a four-wheel drive and manual four-speed transmission. Its top speed was 50 km/h (31 mph). It had a capacity of 1527 cm³.

References

Bibliography 
Jubiläumsfestschrift der A. G. Bernh: Steower Stettin: 1858–1908, in: Deutsche Industrie, deutsche Kultur, vol. 6, 1908. Nr. 2. Katalog der SLUB Dresden.
 Gerhard Maerz. Die Geschichte der Stoewer-Automobile. Kohlhammer Edition, Stuttgart. 1983, ISBN 3-17-007931-X.

1900s cars
Cars introduced in 1901
All-wheel-drive vehicles
10P
Convertibles